Luc Borrelli (2 July 1965 – 3 February 1999) was a French professional footballer who played as a goalkeeper.

Career
Borrelli was born in Marseille and began his career with ASPTT Marseille. In 1986, he moved to Toulon, where he played almost 150 times. In 1993 Borrelli joined Paris Saint Germain, but played just four times in two seasons, leaving for Stade Malherbe Caen in 1995. The highlight of this time at PSG was playing as they won the 1995 Coupe de la Ligue Final against SC Bastia.

Death
In 1998 Borrelli joined Lyon, but was killed in a road accident in February 1999. Lyon subsequently retired the number 16 shirt in his honour, and Caen named an entire grandstand in his honour.

References

External links
 
 Official Site

1965 births
1999 deaths
French footballers
Footballers from Marseille
Association football goalkeepers
Ligue 1 players
Ligue 2 players
SC Toulon players
Paris Saint-Germain F.C. players
Stade Malherbe Caen players
Olympique Lyonnais players